Palo Verde Hospital is an acute care hospital located in Blythe, California.

External links
This hospital in the CA Healthcare Atlas A project by OSHPD

References

Hospital buildings completed in 1925
Hospitals in Riverside County, California
Hospitals established in 1925
Blythe, California